E31 may refer to: 
 European route E31, a series  of roads in Europe
 Seibu Class E31, a Japanese electric locomotive
 BMW 8 Series (E31), a 2-door car built by BMW from 1990 to 1999
 Nimzo-Indian Defence, Leningrad, main line, Encyclopaedia of Chess Openings code
 Damansara–Shah Alam Elevated Expressway, route E31 in Malaysia
 Hiroshima-Kure Road, route E31 in Japan
 Long Win Bus Route E31 in Hong Kong